Charles Andrew Beckett (7 February 1794 – 1838) was an English first-class cricketer associated with Marylebone Cricket Club who was active in the 1810s. He is recorded in two matches, totalling 19 runs with a highest score of 13. He held one catch and took 8 wickets including one return of 4 wickets in an innings.

References

English cricketers
English cricketers of 1787 to 1825
Old Etonians cricketers
1794 births
1838 deaths
Sportspeople from Gravesend, Kent
Marylebone Cricket Club cricketers